Azeez Sait (15 March 1926 – 28 December 2001) was an Indian politician who served as the Minister of State for Transport, Tourism, Labour Wakf Department and Industries and Commerce of Karnataka from 1972 to 1984. A prominent minority leader of the Congress Party, he represented the Narasimharaja constituency in the legislative assembly a record six times between 1967 and his death in 2001.

Career
Azeez Sait belonged to a family of clothiers whose patrons included the Mysore royal family. His father Abdul Sattar Sait had a department store in the Lakshmi complex, opposite the clock tower. Azeez Sait worked in this shop for 17 years before venturing into public life. In 1952, Azeez Sait managed the campaign of advocate Mohammad Shariff in Mandi Mohalla. He was also an active labour leader. He was the founder-president of the Mysore District Beedi Mazdoor Federation. He was the first Muslim to be elected as a Member of the Legislative Council (MLC) for Mysore, Mandya, Kodagu and Hassan.

He was first elected to the State Assembly in 1967 after completing his tenure as an MLC. He was an active member and participated in a three-day dharna in the State Assembly. He was the Chairman of the Karnataka Tourism Development Corporation from 1973 to 1977. He contested Lok Sabha Election from Dharwad and won in 1984. Sait was considered a stormy petrel of Karnataka politics. He served as Minister for Labour, Transport, Tourism, Wakf, and Revenue. Besides being the first Muslim member of the State Legislative Council, he was also a legislator for an uninterrupted tenure of 18 years from 1967 to December 1984.

Sait was a Transport Minister in the Devaraj Urs Ministry. He was a seasoned politician, who was a right-hand man of the late Devraj Urs and minister in his Cabinet. He was also a minister in the Bangarappa Cabinet. In 1982, he joined the Janata Party and became a minister in the first non-Congress Government in Karnataka. In the 1994 assembly election, Sait was defeated by Maruti Rao Pawar. In 1999, he avenged the defeat and returned to the State Assembly from the same Narasimharaja Constituency.

Azeez Sait was also the National Chairman of the AICC Minorities Wing.

Positions held 
 President - Beedi Mazdoor Association, Mysore.
 President - Bangalore District Beedi Mazdoor Association.
 President - B. T. Rice and Oil Mills Workers' Association.
 Member - Labour Advisory Board.
 Member - Labour Implementation and Evaluation Committee.
 Municipal Councillor from 1953 to 1962.
 Member of P.S.P. since 1945; resigned from that party and joined Congress on 22 April 1962.
Member of Legislative Committee (1960-1966).
Founder member and Chairman  (i) RIFA UII Muslimeen Education Trust, Mysore, since 1961.  (ii) Karnataka Wakf Development Corporation.
Chairman  (i) Alameen Education Society (1981-1984).  (ii) Alameen Charitable Trust (1978-1984).  (iii) Tippu Sultan Wakf State till 1983.  (iv) Abul Kalam Azad Academy, Karnataka Branch.  (v) All India Anjumane-Tariqi-e-Urdu Karnataka Branch  (vi) Mysore District School Betterment Committee
President, Karnataka Beedi Workers Federation
Member of Karnataka Legislative Assembly (1967-1984)
Member of 8th Lok Sabha from Dharwad South (Lok Sabha constituency) (1984 - 1989)

Death
In 2001, at the age of 80, Azeez Sait died in a hospital in Mysore following a cardiac arrest. He is survived by his wife, four sons, and two daughters.

References

1921 births
2001 deaths
Indian National Congress politicians from Karnataka
Politicians from Mysore
India MPs 1984–1989
Lok Sabha members from Karnataka
Samyukta Socialist Party politicians
Janata Party politicians
Indian National Congress (U) politicians
Mysore MLAs 1967–1972
Mysore MLAs 1972–1977
Karnataka MLAs 1978–1983
Karnataka MLAs 1983–1985
Karnataka MLAs 1989–1994
Karnataka MLAs 1999–2004